Psilocybe cubensis is a species of psilocybin mushroom of moderate potency whose principal active compounds are psilocybin and psilocin. Commonly called shrooms, magic mushrooms, golden halos, cubes, or gold caps, it belongs to the fungus family Hymenogastraceae and was previously known as Stropharia cubensis.  It is the best-known psilocybin mushroom due to its wide distribution and ease of cultivation. This mushroom being optimal for home cultivation specifically, as was suggested in the 1970s, is primarily what led to cubensis being the psilocybin mushroom species most common on the black market as a street drug.

Taxonomy and naming 

The species was first described in 1906 as Stropharia cubensis by American mycologist Franklin Sumner Earle in Cuba. In 1907, it was identified as Naematoloma caerulescens in Tonkin (now northern Vietnam) by  French pharmacist and mycologist Narcisse Théophile Patouillard, while in 1941, it was called Stropharia cyanescens by William Alphonso Murrill near Gainesville in Florida. German-born mycologist Rolf Singer moved the species into the genus Psilocybe in 1949, giving it the binomial name Psilocybe cubensis. The synonyms were later also assigned to the species Psilocybe cubensis.

The name  Psilocybe  is derived from the Ancient Greek roots psilos (ψιλος) and kubê (κυβη), and translates as "bare head". Cubensis means "coming from Cuba", and refers to the type locality published by Earle.

Singer divided P. cubensis into three varieties: the nominate, which usually had a brownish cap, Murrill's cyanescens from Florida, which generally had a pale cap, and var caerulascens from Indochina with a more yellowish cap.

Psilocybe cubensis is commonly known as gold top, golden top or gold cap in Australia, sacred mushroom or blue mushroom in Brazil, and San Ysidro or Palenque mushroom in the United States and Mexico, while the term "magic mushroom" has been applied to hallucinogenic mushrooms in general. A common name in Thai is "Hed keequai", which translates as "mushroom which appears after water buffalo defecates".

Description 

The cap surface is smooth and sticky, sometimes with white universal veil remnants attached. The cap is brown becoming paler to almost white at the margin and fades to more golden-brown or yellowish with age. When bruised, all parts of the mushroom stain blue. The narrow grey gills are adnate to adnexed, sometimes seceding attachment, and darken to purplish-black and somewhat mottled with age. The gill edges remain whitish. The well-developed veil leaves a persistent white membranous ring whose surface usually becomes the same color as the gills because of falling spores. The fruiting bodies are 90% water. The mushroom has no odor and has been described as tasting farinaceous, with an alkaline or metallic aftertaste. The spores are 11.5–17.3 x 8–11.5 µm, sub-ellipsoid, basidia 4-spored but sometimes 2- or 3-, pleurocystidia and cheilocystidia present. 

The related species Psilocybe subcubensis—found in tropical regions—is indistinguishable but has smaller spores.

Distribution and habitat
Psilocybe cubensis is a pan-tropical species, occurring in the Gulf Coast states and southeastern United States, Mexico, in the Central American countries of Belize, Costa Rica, and Guatemala, the Caribbean countries Cuba, the Dominican Republic, Guadalupe, Martinique, and Trinidad,  in the South American countries of Argentina, Bolivia, Brazil, Colombia, French Guiana, Paraguay, Uruguay and Peru, Southeast Asia, including Thailand, Vietnam, Cambodia and Malaysia, India, Australia (including Tasmania), New Zealand, Fiji, and possibly Nepal and Hawaii.

Psilocybe cubensis is found on cow (and occasionally horse) dung, sugar cane mulch or rich pasture soil, with mushrooms appearing from February to December in the northern hemisphere, and November to April in the southern hemisphere. In Asia, the species grows on water buffalo dung. Along with other fungi that grow on cow dung, P. cubensis is thought to have colonized Australia with the introduction of cattle there, 1800 of which were on the Australian mainland by 1803—having been transported there from the Cape of Good Hope, Kolkata and the American west coast. In Australia, the species grows between northern Queensland to southern New South Wales. 

In March 2018, several Psilocybe cubensis specimens were collected in Zimbabwe in the Wedza District of Mashonaland East province, approx. 120 km southeast of Harare. This was the first reported occurrence of a psilocybin mushroom in Zimbabwe. The mushrooms were collected on Imire Rhino & Wildlife Conservation - a nature reserve that is home to both wildlife and cattle, as well as cattle egrets.

Psychedelic and entheogenic use 

Singer noted that Psilocybe cubensis had psychoactive properties in 1949.

In Australia, the use of psychoactive mushrooms grew rapidly between 1969 and 1975.

In a 1992 paper, locals and tourists in Thailand were reported to consume P. cubensis and related species in mushroom omelets—particularly in Ko Samui and Ko Pha-ngan. At times, omelets were adulterated with LSD, resulting in prolonged intoxication. A thriving subculture had developed in the region. Other localities, such as Hat Yai, Ko Samet, and Chiang Mai, also had some reported usage.

In 1996, jars of honey containing Psilocybe cubensis were confiscated at the Dutch-German border. Upon examination, it was revealed that jars of honey containing psychedelic mushrooms were being sold at Dutch coffee shops. 

P. cubensis is probably the most widely known of the psilocybin-containing mushrooms used for triggering psychedelic experiences after ingestion.
Its major psychoactive compounds are:

 Psilocybin (4-phosphoryloxy-N,N-dimethyltryptamine)
 Psilocin (4-hydroxy-N,N-dimethyltryptamine)
 Baeocystin (4-phosphoryloxy-N-methyltryptamine)
 Norbaeocystin (4-phosphoryloxytryptamine)
 Aeruginascin (N,N,N-trimethyl-4-phosphoryloxytryptamine)

The concentrations of psilocin and psilocybin, as determined by high-performance liquid chromatography, are in the range of 0.14–0.42% (wet weight) and 0.37–1.30% (dry weight) in the whole mushroom 0.17–0.78% (wet weight) and 0.44–1.35% (dry weight) in the cap, and 0.09%–0.30% (wet weight) and 0.05–1.27% (dry weight) in the stem, respectively. For quickly and practically measuring the psychoactive contents of most healthy Psilocybe cubensis varieties, it can generally be assumed that there is approximately 15mg (+/- 5mg) of psilocybin per gram of dried mushroom. Furthermore, due to factors such as age and storage method, the psilocybin and psilocin content of a given sample of mushrooms will vary.

Individual brain chemistry and psychological predisposition play a significant role in determining appropriate doses. For a modest psychedelic effect, a minimum of one gram of dried Psilocybe cubensis mushrooms is ingested orally, 0.25–1 gram is usually sufficient to produce a mild effect, 1–2.5 grams usually provides a moderate effect and 2.5 grams and higher usually produces strong effects. For most people, 3.5 dried grams (1/8 oz) would be considered a high dose and may produce an intense experience; this is, however, typically considered a standard dose among recreational users. For many individuals, doses above three grams may be overwhelming. For a few rare people, doses as small as 0.25 gram can produce full-blown effects normally associated with very high doses. For most people, however, that dose level would have virtually no effects. 

There are many different ways to ingest Psilocybe cubensis. Consumers may prefer to take them raw, freshly harvested, or dried and preserved. It is also possible to prepare culinary dishes with the mushrooms, such as pasta or tea. However, the psychoactive compounds begin to break down rapidly at temperatures exceeding 100°C (212°F). Another method of ingestion known as "Lemon Tekking" involves combining pulverized Psilocybe cubensis with a concentrated citrus juice with a pH of ~2. Many users believe that a considerable amount of the psilocybin will have been dephosphorylated into psilocin, the psychoactive metabolite, by citric acid. However, this claim is not substantiated by the literature on the metabolism of psilocybin, as dephosphorylation is known to be mediated by the enzyme alkaline phosphatase in humans. It's therefore more likely that citric acid mostly helps in breakdown of mushroom cells, aiding in digestion and  psilocybin release.
The "Lemon Tekk" method of consumption results in a more rapid onset and can offer easier digestion or reduced "come-up pressure" associated with raw consumption. Psilocybin cubensis can also be taken in conjunction with other botanicals such as turmeric, ginger, and black pepper. A 2019 study observed turmeric to act as a mild MAOI, which, when combined with psilocin, potentiates the biochemical interactions between serotonin receptors and psilocin, creating an entourage effect.   

Upon ingestion, effects usually begin after approximately 20–60 minutes (depending on the method of ingestion and stomach contents) and may last from four to ten hours, depending on dosage and individual biochemistry. Visual distortions often occur, including walls that seem to breathe, a vivid enhancement of colors, and the animation of organic shapes. 

The effects of high doses can be overwhelming depending on the particular phenotype of cubensis, grow method, and the individual. It is recommended not to eat wild mushrooms without properly identifying them as they may be poisonous. In particular, similar species include mushrooms of the genus Galerina and Pholiotina rugosa—all potentially deadly—and Chlorophyllum molybdites. All of these grow in pastures—similar habitat to that preferred by P. cubensis.

In 2019, a 15-year-old boy suffered from transient kidney failure after eating P. cubensis from a cultivation kit in Canada. No one else in the group suffered any ill effects.

Within the sub-strains of Psilocybe cubensis, the Penis Envy strain tends to contain much more Psilocybin and Psilocin when compared to others.

Legality 

Psilocybin and psilocin are listed as Schedule I drugs under the United Nations 1971 Convention on Psychotropic Substances.  However, mushrooms containing psilocybin and psilocin are not illegal in some parts of the world.  For example, in Brazil they are legal, but extractions from the mushroom containing psilocybin and psilocin remain illegal. In the United States, growing or possessing Psilocybe cubensis mushrooms is illegal in all states, but it is legal to possess and buy the spores for microscopy purposes. However, as of May 8, 2019 Denver, Colorado has decriminalized it for those 21 and up. On June 4, 2019, Oakland, California followed suit, decriminalizing psilocybin-containing mushrooms as well as the Peyote cactus. On January 29, 2020, Santa Cruz, California decriminalized naturally-occurring psychedelics, including psilocybin mushrooms. On November 3, 2020, the state of Oregon decriminalized possession of psilocybin mushrooms for recreational use and granted licensed practitioners permission to administer psilocybin mushrooms to individuals age 21 years and older.

In 1978, the Florida Supreme Court ruled in Fiske vs Florida that possession of psilocybin mushrooms is not illegal, in that the mushrooms cannot be considered a "container" for psilocybin based on how the law is written, i.e., it does not specifically state that psilocybin mushrooms themselves are illegal, but that the hallucinogenic constituents in them are. According to this decision, the applicable statute as framed imparts no information as to which plants may contain psilocybin in its natural state and does not advise a person of ordinary intelligence that this substance is contained in a particular variety of mushroom. The statute, therefore, can not constitutionally be applied to the appellant.

Cultivation  

Psilocybe cubensis grows naturally in tropical and subtropical conditions, often near cattle due to the ideal conditions they provide for the growth of the fungus. The cow usually consumes grains or grass covered with the spores of Psilocybe cubensis and the fungus will begin to germinate within the dung. 

Mushrooms such as Psilocybe cubensis are relatively easy to cultivate indoors. First, spores are inoculated within sterilized jars or bags, colloquially known as grainspawn, containing a form of carbohydrate nutrient such as rye grains. After approximately one month, the spores fully colonize the grain spawn forming dense mycelium, which is then planted within a substrate such as a coconut husk fiber and vermiculite mixture. Given proper humidity, temperature, and fresh air exchange, the substrate will produce fruiting Psilocybe cubensis bodies within a month of planting. To preserve potency after harvesting, growers often dehydrate the fruit and store them in air-tight containers in cool environments.

A study conducted in 2009 showed that mushrooms grown in the dark had higher levels of psilocybin and psilocin compared to the mushrooms grown in bright, indirect light, which had minimum levels.

Studies were conducted where an environmentally controlled wind tunnel and a computer program were used to determine the influence of humidity on the individual basidiocarps of Psilocybe cubensis which aided in mapping their growth and development. The transpiration and growth of the mushroom were heavily influenced due to the humidity of the air, and the transpiration was accelerated at higher humidities while light did not affect the growth. Faster growth was observed at higher humidities. It was also discovered that misting enhanced both the growth and transpiration rates in the growing process of Psilocybe cubensis.

Personal-scale cultivation of Psilocybe cubensis mushrooms ranges from the relatively simple and small-scale PF Tek and other "cake" methods that produce a limited amount of mushrooms to advanced techniques utilizing methods of professional mushroom cultivators. These advanced methods require a greater investment of time, money, and knowledge but reward the diligent cultivator with far larger and much more consistent harvests.

Terence and Dennis McKenna made Psilocybe cubensis particularly famous when they published Psilocybin: Magic Mushroom Grower's Guide in the 1970s upon their return from the Amazon rainforest, having deduced new methods (based on pre-existing techniques originally described by J.P. San Antonio) for growing psilocybin mushrooms and assuring their audience that Psilocybe cubensis were amongst the easiest psilocybin-containing mushrooms to cultivate.

The potency of cultivated specimens can vary widely per each flush (harvest). In a classic paper published by Jeremy Bigwood and M.W. Beug, it was shown that with each flush, psilocybin levels varied somewhat unpredictably but were much the same on the first flush as they were on the last flush; however, psilocin was typically absent in the first two flushes but peaked by the fourth flush, making it the most potent. Two strains were also analyzed to determine potency in caps and stems: In one strain the caps contained generally twice as much psilocybin as the stems, but the small amount of psilocin present was entirely in the stems. In the other strain, a trace of psilocin was present in the cap but not in the stem; the cap and stem contained equal amounts of psilocybin. The study concluded that the levels of psilocybin and psilocin vary by over a factor of four in cultures of Psilocybe cubensis grown under controlled conditions.

Relationship with cattle  

Because Psilocybe cubensis is intimately associated with cattle ranching, the fungus has found unique dispersal niches not available to most other members of the family Hymenogastraceae. Of particular interest is the cattle egret (Bubulcus ibis), a colonizer of Old World origin (via S. America), whose range of distribution overlaps much of that of Psilocybe cubensis. Cattle egrets typically walk alongside cattle, preying on insects; they track through spore-laden vegetation and cow dung and transfer the spores to suitable habitats, often thousands of miles away during migration activities. This type of spore dispersal is known as zoochory, and it enables a parent species to propagate over a much greater range than it could achieve alone. The relationship between cattle, cattle egrets, and Psilocybe cubensis is an example of symbiosis—a situation in which dissimilar organisms live together in close association.

As a human pathogen
One case of Psilocybe cubensis-induced fungemia has been reported, in which a 30-year-old man boiled psilocybin mushrooms in water, filtered the liquid through a cotton swab, and injected it intravenously. Over the next few days he developed lethargy, jaundice, diarrhea, nausea, and vomited blood; his family found him like this and took him to hospital. Examination found that he was suffering from multiple organ failure due to bacterial (Brevibacillus) and fungal (Psilocybe cubensis) infection. This required intensive hospital care and long-term medication with antifungal and antibacterial medications.

See also 

 List of psilocybin mushrooms
 List of psychoactive plants, fungi, and animals
 Psilocybin mushrooms
 Botanical identity of soma-haoma
 Psilocybin decriminalization in the United States

References == @22 00 22 Books n Texts

Further reading 

 Guzman, G. The Genus Psilocybe: A Systematic Revision of the Known Species Including the History, Distribution and Chemistry of the Hallucinogenic Species. Beihefte zur Nova Hedwigia Heft 74. J. Cramer, Vaduz, Germany (1983) [now out of print].
 Guzman, G. "Supplement to the genus Psilocybe." Bibliotheca Mycologica 159: 91-141 (1995).
 Haze, Virginia & Dr, K. Mandrake, PhD. The Psilocybin Mushroom Bible: The Definitive Guide to Growing and Using Magic Mushrooms. Green Candy Press: Toronto, Canada, 2016. . www.greencandypress.com.

External links 

 The Ones That Stain Blue Studies in ethnomycology including the contributions of Maria Sabina, Dr. Albert Hofmann and Dr. Gaston Guzman.
 Psilocybe cubensis drawings and information
 Erowid Psilocybin Mushroom Vault
 Mushroom John's Tale of the Shrooms: Psilocybe cubensis
 Psilocybe Cubensis== References == @22 00 22 Books n Texts

Entheogens
Fungi described in 1906
Psychoactive fungi
cubensis
Psychedelic tryptamine carriers
Soma (drink)